Han Tae-you (born March 30, 1981) is a South Korean football player.

Career statistics 
''As of 24 July 2014

Honors

Club 
FC Seoul
K League
Winners (1): 2010, 2012
League Cup
Winners (1): 2010

References

1981 births
Living people
Association football midfielders
South Korean footballers
South Korea international footballers
FC Seoul players
Gimcheon Sangmu FC players
K League 1 players
Myongji University alumni
Sportspeople from Ulsan